Agoria, born Sébastien Devaud (born 16 January 1976) is a French electronic record producer, composer, and DJ. He has released four albums, including the soundtrack to the film Go Fast. He is one of the founders of the record label InFiné and also helped to create the music festival Nuits Sonores.

References

External links 

Agoria artist's website

 

French record producers
French electronic musicians
1976 births
Living people
Place of birth missing (living people)